Alex Salmond formed the second Salmond government on 19 May 2011 following his Scottish National Party's landslide victory in the 2011 election to the 4th Scottish Parliament. This was the first single-party majority government in the history of the devolved parliament. Salmond's second administration ended on 19 November 2014 in the aftermath of his resignation as First Minister of Scotland.

History

2011 to 2012 
On 18 May 2011, after Salmond was re-elected as first minister, his cabinet was increased in size, from five cabinet secretaries to eight. Nicola Sturgeon was re-appointed as Deputy First Minister and Health Secretary. John Swinney, Kenny McAskill and Richard Lochhead all remained in cabinet, with Fiona Hyslop returning, having served as Education Secretary from 2007 to 2009. Bruce Crawford and Alex Neil were promoted to cabinet.

2012 to 2013 
In September 2012, Salmond made a snap reshuffle in light of the 2014 Scottish independence referendum. Nicola Sturgeon and Alex Neil switched roles, with Sturgeon taking on responsibility for the independence referendum. Bruce Crawford announced his retirement from government.

2013 to 2014 
In 2014, Shona Robison and Angela Constance were promoted to cabinet. Robison over saw relations for the 2014 Glasgow Commonwealth Games and Constance saw matters of employment.

Salmond announced his resignation as leader of the Scottish National Party on 19 September 2014 following the Scottish independence referendum; his resignation as SNP Leader took effect on 14 November when Nicola Sturgeon was elected unopposed to replace him.

On the 18 November, Salmond officially resigned as first minister and two days later Sturgeon formed her first administration, dissolving Salmond's cabinet.

Cabinet

May 2011 to September 2012

September 2012 to November 2014

Junior ministers

Scottish law officers

References

Alex Salmond
Salmond, second
2011 establishments in Scotland
2014 disestablishments in Scotland
Ministries of Elizabeth II